Booral is a coastal locality in the Fraser Coast Region, Queensland, Australia. In the  Booral had a population of 1,540 people.

History
The name Booral is a Kabi language word meaning either tall (relating to the sky god Beiral) or burrall meaning place of shell mounds. Many shell mounds have been found along the coastline, arising from Aboriginal people feasting on shellfish. Aboriginal people travelled from the Bunya Mountains to trade bunya nuts for shellfish. It is believed Aboriginal people inhabited the area for over 6,000 years.

Edgar Thomas Aldridge established the Booral Homestead in the 1850s.

In the 2011 census, Booral had a population of 1,449 people.

In the  Booral had a population of 1,540 people.

Geography
The waters of Hervey Bay form the eastern boundary.

Economy
The proximity to the Great Sandy Strait enables salt water aquaculture, including the farming of fish, sea cucumbers and soft shell crabs.

Community associations
The Booral Community Association Inc is a group of volunteers who seek to promote the interests of the community at all levels of government. A major issue for the group has been the restriction of foreshore access to only certain property holders rather than to the general public.

References

External links
 

Fraser Coast Region
Coastline of Queensland
Localities in Queensland